Liam de Young  is an Australian field hockey player. He played club hockey for St Andrew's.  He is a member of Australia men's national field hockey team, winning a gold medal with the team at the 2002 Commonwealth Games, a gold medal at the 2004 Summer Olympics, a bronze medal at the 2008 Summer Olympics and another bronze medal at the 2012 Summer Olympics.

Personal
De Young is from Bray Park, Queensland. He attended Pine Rivers State High School. He moved to Perth, Western Australia in order to be more available to the national team.

Field hockey
De Young is a midfielder. In 2002, he played for the St Andrew's club after not having played for the club in two years.  He was the first player from St Andrew's to make Australia's senior national team. In 2010, he played in the final game of the season for his state team in the Australian Hockey League.

National team
De Young made his senior national team debut in 2001.

He won a gold medal at the 2002 Commonwealth Games in Manchester, England.

He won a gold medal at the 2004 Summer Olympics, Australia's first ever gold medal in men's field hockey at the Olympics. His mother, father and two brothers were in Athens to watch him win gold. In recognition of this, de Young was awarded the Medal of the Order of Australia (OAM) in the 2005 Australia Day Honours.

In 2006, he represented Australia at the Azlan Shah tournament in Malaysia. He competed in the 2007 Champions Trophy competition for Australia.

He won a bronze medal at the 2008 Summer Olympics, playing in every match at the Games for Australia.

New national team coach Ric Charlesworth named him, a returning member, and fourteen total new players who had few than 10 national team caps to the squad before in April 2009 in a bid to ready the team for the 2010 Commonwealth Games. In 2009, he was a member of the national team during a five-game test series in Kuala Lumpur, Malaysia against Malaysia. He was a member of the national team in 2010. That year, he was a member of the team that finished first at the Hockey Champions Trophy. In May 2011, he played in the Azlan Shah Cup for Australia.  The Cup featured teams from Pakistan, Malaysia, India, South Korea, Britain and New Zealand. In December 2011, he was named as one of twenty-eight players to be on the 2012 Summer Olympics Australian men's national training squad.  This squad was narrowed in June 2012.  He trained with the team from 18 January to mid-March in Perth, Western Australia. In February during the training camp, he played in a four nations test series with the teams being the Kookaburras, Australia A Squad, the Netherlands and Argentina. He played for the Australian A team in their 3–1 loss to the Kookaburras in the first round of the competition.  He scored his team's only goal. He was selected to play for Australia at the 2012 Summer Olympics, where they won the bronze medal.

He was also part of the Australian team that won the 2014 World Cup. At the 2014 Sultan Azlan Shah Cup, De Young became just the fourth man to make 300 national team appearances for Australia (the other three being Jay Stacy, Brent Livermore and Jamie Dwyer).

References

External links
 

Living people
Australian male field hockey players
Male field hockey midfielders
Olympic field hockey players of Australia
Field hockey players at the 2004 Summer Olympics
Field hockey players at the 2008 Summer Olympics
Field hockey players at the 2012 Summer Olympics
2002 Men's Hockey World Cup players
2006 Men's Hockey World Cup players
2010 Men's Hockey World Cup players
2014 Men's Hockey World Cup players
Field hockey players at the 2006 Commonwealth Games
Field hockey players at the 2010 Commonwealth Games
Recipients of the Medal of the Order of Australia
Sportspeople from Brisbane
Olympic gold medalists for Australia
Olympic bronze medalists for Australia
Commonwealth Games gold medallists for Australia
Olympic medalists in field hockey
Medalists at the 2012 Summer Olympics
Medalists at the 2008 Summer Olympics
Year of birth missing (living people)
Medalists at the 2004 Summer Olympics
Commonwealth Games medallists in field hockey
Medallists at the 2006 Commonwealth Games